Vasyl Semeniuk (born 2 August 1949) is the Metropolitan Archeparch of the Ukrainian Catholic Archeparchy of Ternopil–Zboriv, an archeparchy of the Ukrainian Greek Catholic Church.  The eparchy is in the ecclesiastical province of Kyiv-Halych.

He was ordained priest on 22 December 1974 and was elected to the eparchy on 19 October 2006, having previously been Auxiliary Bishop of the eparchy from 2004.

References

External links

1949 births
Archbishops of the Ukrainian Greek Catholic Church
Ukrainian Eastern Catholics
Bishops of the Eparchy of Ternopil - Zboriv
Living people
21st-century Eastern Catholic bishops
Laureates of the State Prize of Ukraine in the Field of Architecture